Capital Medical University (CMU) is a public research university in Beijing, China. Capital Medical University was founded in 1960, with the original name of Beijing Second Medical College.

Academics

Rankings and reputation 
Capital Medical University is listed as one of the top 400 universities in the World University Rankings. CMU is consistently ranked among the top medical schools in China and has ranked in the top 1 or 2 best nationwide, together with Peking Union Medical College among Chinese Medical Universities in the recognized Best Chinese Universities Ranking. 

As of 2022, its "Dentistry & Oral Sciences", "Medical Technology", "Biomedical Engineering", and "Nursing" were ranked in the top 200 in the world , while "Biological Sciences", "Human Biological Science", "Human Biological Sciences", "Public Health", and "Clinical Medicine" were placed in the top 300 in the world by the Academic Ranking of World Universities. Its "Clinical Medicine" also ranked 209th globally by the U.S. News & World Report.

Nature Index 
Nature Index tracks the affiliations of high-quality scientific articles and presents research outputs by institution and country on monthly basis.

Times Higher Education (THE)

U.S. News & World Report Best Global Universities Ranking

CUAA (Chinese Universities Alumni Association) 
Universities Ranking of China released by CUAA (Chinese Universities Alumni Association, Chinese: 中国校友会网) is one of the most foremost domestic university rankings in China.

References

External links
 Capital Medical University

Capital Medical University
Universities and colleges in Beijing
Schools in Fengtai District
Educational institutions established in 1960
1960 establishments in China
Medical schools in China